Eren Taşkin (born 26 August 1992) is a German footballer who plays as an attacking midfielder for Sportfreunde Baumberg. He made his 2. Bundesliga debut for Fortuna Düsseldorf on 22 December 2013 in a 2–3 home defeat against 1. FC Köln.

References

External links
 
 
 

1992 births
Footballers from Duisburg
German people of Turkish descent
German people of Azerbaijani descent
Living people
German footballers
Association football midfielders
FC Schalke 04 II players
MSV Duisburg II players
Fortuna Düsseldorf II players
Fortuna Düsseldorf players
SG Wattenscheid 09 players
Fatih Karagümrük S.K. footballers
Eyüpspor footballers
Kahramanmaraşspor footballers
Regionalliga players
2. Bundesliga players
TFF Second League players
German expatriate footballers
Expatriate footballers in Turkey
German expatriate sportspeople in Turkey